OA-5, previously known as Orbital-5, was the seventh planned flight of the Orbital Sciences' uncrewed resupply spacecraft Cygnus and its sixth flight to the International Space Station under the Commercial Resupply Services contract with NASA. The mission launched on 17 October 2016 at 23:45:36 UTC. Orbital Sciences and NASA jointly developed a new space transportation system to provide commercial cargo resupply services to the International Space Station (ISS). Under the Commercial Orbital Transportation System (COTS) program, Orbital designed and built Antares, a medium-class launch vehicle; Cygnus, an advanced maneuvering spacecraft; and a Pressurized Cargo Module which is provided by Orbital's industrial partner Thales Alenia Space.

The Cygnus spacecraft for this mission is named the S.S. Alan Poindexter in honor to astronaut Alan G. Poindexter, a deceased Space Shuttle commander. Poindexter was selected in the 1998 NASA Group (G17) and went into orbit aboard Space Shuttle missions STS-122 and STS-131.

History 

The COTS demonstration mission was successfully conducted in September 2013, and Orbital commenced operational ISS cargo missions under the Commercial Resupply Service (CRS) program with two missions in 2014. Regrettably, the third operational mission, Cygnus Orb-3, was not successful due to spectacular Antares failure during launch. The company decided to discontinue the Antares 100 series and accelerate the introduction of a new propulsion system. The Antares system is being upgraded with newly built RD-181 first stage engines to provide greater payload performance and increased reliability.

In late 2014, Orbital Sciences contracted United Launch Alliance for an Atlas V launch of Cygnus CRS OA-4 in late 2015 from Cape Canaveral, Florida, and with a second Atlas V launch of Cygnus in 2016. The company plans three Cygnus missions in 2016, in the first (Cygnus CRS OA-6), third (Cygnus CRS OA-5) and fourth quarters (Cygnus OA-7) of 2016. The Cygnus OA-5 and OA-7 will fly on the new Antares 230 and OA-6 will fly on second Atlas V in first quarter of 2016. These three missions enable Orbital ATK to fulfill their CRS contracted payload obligation. This particular mission is known as OA-5.

Production and integration of Cygnus spacecraft is performed in Dulles, Virginia. The Cygnus service module is mated with the pressurized cargo module at the launch site, and mission operations are conducted from control centers in Dulles, Virginia and Houston, Texas.

Spacecraft 

This was the sixth of ten flights by Orbital ATK under the Commercial Resupply Services (CRS) contract with NASA. This was the third flight of the Enhanced sized Cygnus PCM. The mission successfully launched on 17 October 2016, 23:45 UTC.

In keeping with an Orbital ATK tradition, this Cygnus spacecraft is named the S.S. Alan Poindexter after the NASA astronaut who flew aboard the Space Shuttle twice (2008 and 2010).

Manifest 
Total cargo mass on ascent:  
 Pressurized cargo with packaging:  
 Science investigations: 
 Crew supplies: 
 Vehicle hardware: 
 Spacewalk equipment: 
 Computer resources: 
 Russian hardware: 
 Unpressurized cargo (CubeSats): 
 Total cargo on descent (destructive):

Other OA projects 
NASA had planned the next Cygnus flight, Cygnus CRS OA-7, for 30 December 2016. However, in October 2016, it was announced that OA-7 was being delayed until March 2017 and switched from the Antares launch vehicle to a United Launch Alliance Atlas V rocket to provide additional cargo up mass for NASA.

In 2015, under the NASA CRS-1 contract, Orbital Sciences was awarded three extension flights for 2017 and 2018. The Cygnus CRS OA-8E flight has tentatively been scheduled for 12 June 2017, followed by Cygnus OA-9E later that year and OA-10E in 2018. Cargo vehicle scheduling is dynamic with the ISS partners. The schedule will be influenced by the first USA crewed commercial flights (SpaceX, Boeing) to ISS since Space Shuttle retirement in 2011.

Cubesat release 
On 25 November 2016, after leaving the ISS, the spacecraft raised its orbit to 500 kilometers and released four Lemur-2 cubesats for Spire Global.

See also 
 Uncrewed spaceflights to the International Space Station

References 

Cygnus (spacecraft)
Spacecraft launched by Antares rockets
Spacecraft launched in 2016
Spacecraft which reentered in 2016
Supply vehicles for the International Space Station